Viola Pettus was an American nurse, born in 1886, who lived in Marathon, Brewster County, Texas. Viola is remembered in Texas for her work as a nurse during the 1918 flu pandemic.

Community carework 
Pettus, whose nursing skills were learned by experience rather than formal training, ran an isolated tent hospital in rural west Texas. Her generous outreach, especially during the 1918 flu pandemic — providing nursing care to all seekers, including members of the Ku Klux Klan — was based in her understanding of Christian service. Her care for Mexicans who crossed into Texas without papers brought her into conflict with local authorities.

Sometime prior to 1929, Viola and Benjamin Pettus opened their home in Marathon, Texas, to African-American and Seminole children of the community who were denied education in the segregated school system of Brewster County.

Personal life and legacy
Viola was married to Benjamin Pettus. They had three daughters: Ura, Hazel, and Dorothy. The US Census lists the Pettus family as living in Justice Precinct 3, Brewster County, Texas, in 1910 and 1920. Pettus's life formed the basis for one of the plot lines in American Night: The Ballad of Juan José, a 2010 play by Richard Montoya, a member of the Culture Clash performance group.

Notes

African-American history of Texas